The 2018–19 Cypriot Cup for lower divisions was the 11th edition of the Cypriot Cup for lower divisions. A total of 22 clubs entered the competition. It began on 24 October 2018 with the first round and concluded on 8 May 2019 with the final which was held at AEK Arena. Digenis Morphou won their 2nd cup trophy after beating Olympias Lympion, in the final.

Format
Only teams from the Cypriot Third Division and STOK Elite Division could participate. Participation was not compulsory. 22 of 30 participated this season.

The competition consisted of five rounds. In the first, second and third round each tie was played as a single leg and was held at the home ground of one of the two teams, according to the draw results. Each tie winner was qualifying for the next round. If a match was drawn, extra time was following. If extra time was drawn, there was a replay at the ground of the team who were away for the first game. If the rematch was also drawn, then extra time was following and if the match remained drawn after extra time the winner was decided by penalty shoot-out.

The fourth round was played in a two-legged format, each team playing a home and an away match against their opponent. The team which scored more goals on aggregate was qualifying for the next round. If the two teams scored the same number of goals on aggregate, then the team which scored more goals away from home was advancing to the next round. 
 
If both teams had scored the same number of home and away goals, then extra time was following after the end of the second leg match. If during the extra thirty minutes both teams had managed to score, but they had scored the same number of goals, then the team who scored the away goals was advancing to the next round (i.e. the team which was playing away). If there weren't scored any goals during extra time, the qualifying team was determined by penalty shoot-out.

The final will be a single match.

First round
The first round draw took place on 9 October 2018 and the matches played on 24 October 2018.

|}

Round of 16
The round of 16 draw, took place on 11 December 2018 and the matches played on 16 and 23 January 2019.

|}

Quarter-finals
The quarter-finals draw took place on 30 January 2019 and the matches played on 20, 27 February 2019.

|}

Semi-finals
The semi-finals draw took place on 6 March 2019 and the matches will played on 27 March and 3 April 2019.

|}

Final

References

Cypriot Cup for lower divisions seasons
Cyprus 2
Cup For Lower Divisions